Hemigenia is a genus of flowering plants in the mint family, Lamiaceae and is endemic to Australia where most species occur in Western Australia, although some are also found in New South Wales and Queensland. Plants in this genus are shrubs or bushes with simple leaves and tube-shaped flowers with the petals forming two "lips" - the upper one with two lobes and the lower one with three.

Description
Plants in the genus Hemigenia are shrubs or bushes with simple leaves which are arranged either in opposite pairs or in whorls. The flowers are arranged singly or in groups in upper leaf axils, often appearing to form a spike of flowers. There are five sepals which are joined at their base to form a tube. The five petals form a tube with two "lips" - an upper lip with two lobes and a lower one with three. There are four stamens.

Plants in this genus can be distinguished from those in the similar and closely related Hemiandra by their less strongly odoriferous leaves and from Prostanthera, Microcorys and Westringia by technical differences in their stamens.

Taxonomy
The genus Hemigenia was first formally described in 1810 by Robert Brown and the description was published in Prodromus Florae Novae Hollandiae. Brown nominated Hemigenia purpurea the type species. The genus name is derived from the Ancient Greek words hemi and  meaning "a beard" referring to a part of the anthers.

Distribution
Hemigenia species are mostly endemic to Western Australia, but H. cuneifolia occurs in New South Wales and Queensland, H. biddulphiana grows in Queensland and H. purpurea in New South Wales.

Species list
The following is a list of Hemigenia species accepted by the Australian Plant Census as at November 2020:
 
Hemigenia appressa G.R.Guerin
Hemigenia argentea Bartl. 
Hemigenia barbata Bartl. 
Hemigenia benthamii G.R.Guerin
Hemigenia biddulphiana F.Muell.
Hemigenia botryphylla G.R.Guerin
Hemigenia brachyphylla F.Muell. 
Hemigenia bracteosa G.R.Guerin
Hemigenia buccinata G.R.Guerin
Hemigenia canescens (Bartl.) Benth. 
Hemigenia ciliata G.R.Guerin
Hemigenia coccinea C.A.Gardner 
Hemigenia conferta B.J.Conn 
Hemigenia cuneifolia Benth.
Hemigenia curvifolia F.Muell. 
Hemigenia dielsii (Hemsl.) C.A.Gardner 
Hemigenia diplanthera F.Muell. 
Hemigenia divaricata C.A.Gardner
Hemigenia drummondii Benth. 
Hemigenia dulca G.R.Guerin
Hemigenia exilis S.Moore 
Hemigenia humilis Benth. 
Hemigenia incana (Lindl.) Benth.
Hemigenia loganiacea (F.Muell.) F.Muell.
Hemigenia macphersonii Luehm. 
Hemigenia macrantha F.Muell. 
Hemigenia microphylla Benth. 
Hemigenia obovata F.Muell. 
Hemigenia obtusa Benth. - blunt-leaved hemigenia
Hemigenia pachyphylla G.R.Guerin
Hemigenia parviflora Bartl. 
Hemigenia pedunculata Diels 
Hemigenia pimelifolia F.Muell. 
Hemigenia platyphylla (Bartl.) Benth. 
Hemigenia podalyrina F.Muell. 
Hemigenia pritzelii S.Moore 
Hemigenia purpurea  R.Br. 
Hemigenia ramosissima Benth. 
Hemigenia rigida Benth. 
Hemigenia royceana G.R.Guerin
Hemigenia saligna Diels 
Hemigenia scabra Benth. 
Hemigenia sericea Benth. - silky hemigenia
Hemigenia tenelliflora G.R.Guerin
Hemigenia teretiuscula F.Muell.
Hemigenia tichbonii K.R.Thiele & G.R.Guerin
Hemigenia tomentosa G.R.Guerin
Hemigenia tysonii F.Muell. 
Hemigenia virescens G.R.Guerin
Hemigenia viscida S.Moore - sticky hemigenia
Hemigenia wandooana G.R.Guerin
Hemigenia westringioides Benth. - open hemigenia
Hemigenia yalgensis G.R.Guerin

References

 
Lamiaceae genera
Lamiales of Australia
Endemic flora of Australia